Molybdenum(V) fluoride is an inorganic compound with the formula MoF5. It is a hygroscopic yellow solid. Like most pentafluorides, it exists as a tetramer.

Production
Molybdenum(V) fluoride is produced by the reaction of molybdenum and molybdenum hexafluoride:
Mo + 5 MoF6  →  6 MoF5

About 165 °C, it disproportionates to the tetra- and hexafluoride:
2 MoF5  →  MoF4  +  MoF6

References

Fluorides
Molybdenum halides